Stapleford is a village and civil parish in North Kesteven district of Lincolnshire, England, and about  north-east from the town of Newark-on-Trent and  south-west from the city of Lincoln. The population is included in the civil parish of Beckingham.

In the 1086 Domesday Book, Stapleford is listed as having 38 households and a church.

The Grade II listed parish church is dedicated to All Saints and dates from the 11th century, although it was rebuilt in 1770, and restored in 1903–04. In the churchyard is a Grade II listed and scheduled churchyard cross which dates from the 14th century, and is believed to stand in its original position.

Stapleford Woods are under the care of the Forestry Commission.

Stapleford CE School was built in 1867 as a National School. It was closed on 18 July 1984.

Samual Keetly was the pioneer of Stapleford Wood, planting the first trees on Stapleford Moor in 1785. His previous employment was at Wollaton Gardens.  Before any trees were set, the land was turned with an iron plough, with planting taking him ten years to complete.  He was a parishioner of Stapleford for 40 years, having brought his family to live there in 1787.

References

External links

Villages in Lincolnshire
Civil parishes in Lincolnshire
North Kesteven District